Odites assidua is a moth in the family Depressariidae. It was described by Edward Meyrick in 1914. It is found in South Africa.

The wingspan is about 18 mm. The forewings are ochreous whitish with the costal edge light ochreous and the discal stigmata minute and black. The hindwings are ochreous whitish.

References

Endemic moths of South Africa
Moths described in 1914
Odites
Taxa named by Edward Meyrick